Mandat International, also known as the International Cooperation Foundation, is an international non-governmental organization based in Geneva, Switzerland with consultative status to the United Nations Economic and Social Council, the UNDPI, and the United Nations Conference on Trade and Development.

History
Mandat International was established in 1995.

Description
Mandat International is a member of the Internet of Things International Forum and organizes the annual event IoT week.

References

External links

International Declaration on the Internet of Things for Sustainable Development, approved June 9, 2017

Organisations based in Geneva
Research organizations
International law organizations
Foundations based in Switzerland
Internet of things
Privacy organizations
Organizations with year of establishment missing